Illinois Route 158 is an east–west state road in southwestern Illinois. Its western terminus is at Illinois Route 3 in Columbia and its eastern terminus is at U.S. Route 50, in O'Fallon.

Route description 
Illinois 158 is an important east–west highway in the southeastern portions of the metropolitan St. Louis, Missouri area. It runs from Columbia through Millstadt, Belleville, and near the Scott Air Force Base. Portions of the route run north–south geographically.

IL 158 has a wrong-way concurrency with IL 161 near Scott Air Force Base, where you are going east on 158 and west on 161 at the same time.  IDOT has used "North" and "South" cardinal direction banners for IL 158 for that concurrency in an attempt to remove confusion in that area.  For the rest of the route, it is signed "East" and "West".

The eastern terminus is actually the intersection with US 50 just north of I-64.  The road extends past the point as "Scott-Troy Road".

History 
SBI Route 158 ran from Columbia to Belleville on the current Illinois 158 routing. In 1957, it was extended north to O'Fallon, and west to the Jefferson Barracks Bridge; in 1958, Illinois 158 replaced Illinois Route 157 on the bridge approached. In 1960, the western end was brought back to Columbia.

Future 

The Illinois Department of Transportation has included a large portion of Illinois 158 in their Gateway Connector project; a southeastern beltway that would run from Columbia east to Scott Air Force Base, and north to Troy.

Illinois 158 will be a proposed 4-laned expressway all throughout its proposed route, however, some interchanges will have ramps and some may have traffic lights. This project has drawn much criticism from local residents of these areas. At least one organization, the Stop 158 group, has formed to block construction of the road and refocus use of taxpayer's dollars on a new Mississippi River bridge south of St. Louis.

The Gateway Connector remains unfunded for construction through 2010.

Junction list

References 

158
Transportation in Monroe County, Illinois
Transportation in St. Clair County, Illinois